The Bhagalpur violence of 1989 took place between Hindus and Muslims in the Bhagalpur district of Bihar, India. The violence started on 24 October 1989, and the violent incidents continued for 2 months, affecting the Bhagalpur city and 250 villages around it. Over 1,000 people were killed (around 900 of which were Muslims), and another 50,000 were displaced as a result of the violence. It was the worst instance of Hindu-Muslim violence in independent India at the time.

Background 

Bhagalpur has a history of communal violence, and in 1989, the Hindu-Muslims tensions had escalated during the Muharram and Bisheri Puja festivities in August.

In 1989, as part of the Ram Janmabhoomi campaign, which aimed to construct a Hindu temple at Ayodhya in place of the Babri mosque, the Vishwa Hindu Parishad (VHP) had organized a "Ramshila" procession in Bhagalpur. The procession aimed to collect bricks (shilas) for the proposed Ram temple at Ayodhya. One such procession passing through Fatehpur village provoked brickbatting and arson on 22 October. Prior to the outbreak of the riots, two false rumors about the killing of Hindu students started circulating: one rumor stated that nearly 200 Hindu university students had been killed by the Muslims, while another rumor stated that 31 Hindu boys had been murdered with their bodies dumped in a well at the Sanskrit College. Apart from these, the political and criminal rivalries in the area also played a role in inciting the riots.

The trigger 

On 24 October 1989, the Ramshila processions from the various parts of the district were to proceed to the Gaushala area, from where they would move on to Ayodhya. The procession coming from Parbatti area passed peacefully through Tatarpur, a Muslim-dominated area, after its leader Mahadev Prasad Singh told the Hindus not to raise any provocative slogans.

Sometime later, another procession from Nathnagar arrived at Tatarpur. This massive procession was escorted for safety by the police, in the presence of the Superintendent of Police KS Dwivedi. Some members of the procession shouted slogans such as Hindi, Hindu, Hindustan, Mullah Bhago Pakistan ("India is for Hindus, Mullahs go away to Pakistan") and Babur ki auladon, bhago Pakistan ya Kabristan ("Children of Babur, run away to Pakistan or to the graveyard"). The District Magistrate (DM) Arun Jha stopped the procession at the Parbatti-Tatarpur junction. The DM then requested the Muslims to allow the procession to pass through Tatarpur, but the Muslims refused and suggested that the procession take an alternative route to Gaushala.

As the discussions were going on, crude bombs were thrown at the procession from the premises of the Muslim high school nearby. Although no one was killed in the bombing, 11 policemen suffered minor injuries. This is considered as the event which triggered these riots.

The riots 

A curfew was imposed by the state government immediately in the afternoon of October 24, and all the civilian assemblies were declared illegal. When the police opened fire to disperse the crowd at Tatarpur, the Muslims hurled bombs at the District Magistrate, the Superintendent of Police, the other administration officials and the police. The police fired more rounds, leading to the deaths of 2 people.

Meanwhile, the Hindu procession retreated from the Parbatti-Tatarpur junction, and turned into a mob. The mob attacked shops owned by the Muslims on the Nathnagar road (later renamed to Lord Mahavir Path). The Hindu rioters also attempted to storm the Muslim-dominated locality of Assanandpur, but the Muslims there fired at them from the rooftops. The mob then turned to the Hindu-dominated locality Parbatti, where it massacred at least 40 Muslims. As the news of the violence reached the other Ramshila processions at Gaushala, the Hindus went on a rampage, killing Muslims, looting their shops and destroying their property.

On October 25, an 8,000-strong mob looted and destroyed Madaninagar, a Muslim settlement, turning it into a ghost town. They also attacked Kanjhiagram, a nearby locality. Bhatoria, a Muslim-dominated village was attacked on October 25, and again on October 27, killing several Muslims. In Hasnabad, the Shahi Masjid built during Aurangazeb's reign was damaged.

The alleged police atrocities further fueled the violence. Upon immediate request from the state government,   Army was called in on October 26. KS Dwivedi, the Police Superintendent accused of being anti-Muslim, was asked by the Bihar Chief Minister Satyendra Narayan Sinha  to hand over the charge to Ajit Datt on the same day. However, during a tour of the riot-affected area, the Prime Minister Rajiv Gandhi overruled Dwivedi's transfer at the demand of a mob composed of policemen and VHP supporters.

On October 26, at least 11 Muslims were killed in the Brahmin-dominated Parandarpur village. The same day, 18 Muslims including 11 children were killed in full public view, in the Nayabazar area of Bhagalpur. Around 44 Muslims, including 19 children, were provided refuge by some local Hindus in the Jamuna Kothi building. At 11:30 am, a 70-strong mob entered the Jamuna Kothi with swords, axes, hammers and lathis. Within 10 minutes, 18 Muslims were killed. Some of the children were beheaded, some had their limbs cut off while the others were thrown off the third floor. A woman called Bunni Begum had her breasts chopped off. Some other Muslims who had been provided refuge by the Hindus in the neighbouring buildings, managed to survive. In Assanandpur, Muslims also escorted several hostel-resident Hindu students to safety.

Hindustan, a Hindi daily in the state capital Patna, reported that on 31 October, the army soldiers had recovered Pakistan-made arms and ammunition from some miscreants in the Tatarpur area. However, the District Magistrate Arun Jha dismissed the report as "sheer nonsense", and termed the 'foreign hand' theory as "silly".

According to official figures 1,070 people were killed & 524 injured. 15 out of 21 blocks of Bhagalpur were affected by the riots. 11,500 houses in 195 villages were destroyed, displacing 48,000 people. 600 power looms and 1,700 handlooms were burnt to ashes. 68 mosques and 20 mazars were destroyed.

Chandheri massacre 

The Chandheri (also spelled Chanderi) village was attacked from three sides by the people from the adjoining villages on the evening of 27 October. The Yadavs of the neighbouring settlement had disapproved of the construction of a mosque in the village. The attackers set the mosque on the fire, along with some houses, killing 5 people. A Jammu and Kashmir Light Infantry regiment, led by Major G.P.S. Virk and stationed at the Sabaur thana, was overseeing Chandheri and the neighbouring settlement of Rajpur. When Major Virk arrived at the village, he found that some of the Muslims had fled to the neighboring villages, while around 125 of them were hiding in a large house belonging to one Sheikh Minnat. He provided them with police protection, and left with an assurance that he would return in the morning with an army unit to evacuate them to safety.

In the early next morning, a large number of Yadavs, Dusadhs and Kurmis arrived at Sheikh Mannat's house. They claimed that they had come to evacuate the Muslims. However, as soon as the Muslims came out, they were attacked: some were killed on the spot, while the others were paraded to a hyacinth pond before being attacked.

When Major Virk returned to Chandheri at 9:38 am on 28 October, he found the house vacant. At the pond, he found Malika Bano, a survivor whose right leg had been chopped off. 61 mutilated dead bodies were recovered from the pond. The police later filed charges against 38 people in the case, out of which 16 were convicted and awarded rigorous life terms; the other 22 were acquitted.

Logain massacre 

At the Logain village, 116 Muslims were killed by a 4000-strong mob led by the police officer Ramchander Singh. Their bodies were buried and camouflaged by the plantation of cauliflower and cabbage saplings to hide the evidence. 14 people, including the former police officer, were convicted and sentenced to rigorous life imprisonment for the killings, in 2007.

Aftermath 

A three-member Commission of Inquiry was set up by the Bihar State Government consisting of Bihar High Court Judges C.P. Sinha and S. Samshul Hassan to investigate the riots. The Commission submitted its final report in year 1995 and blamed several police officers, including the superintendent of police KS Dwivedi, for failing to stop the violence. A second round of violence happened in March 1990.

142 FIRs were recorded in various police stations. 1,283 persons were accused. 535 cases out of the 864 cases filed were closed, and most of the accused were acquitted for the lack of evidence. The victims accused the Congress government of doing little to stop the riots, and also of not providing them with adequate relief and rehabilitation. The riots happened during the tenure of the Chief Minister Satyendra Narayan Sinha, who stepped down. To pacify the Muslims, the Congress replaced him with Jagannath Mishra, who had become popular in the Muslim community ever since he made Urdu one of the official languages of the State. In his autobiography Meri Yaadein, Meri bhoolein, Sinha accused his Congress colleagues of "fanning" the riots out of personal jealousy and ill-will, specifically mentioning the former chief minister Bhagwat Jha Azad and the former speaker Shivchandra Jha. He also accused the Prime Minister Rajiv Gandhi of overruling his order to transfer the then superintendent of police K S Dwivedi without consulting him, although Dwivedi had completely failed to control the riots. He alleged that the decision was "not only an encroachment of the Constitutional right of the state government but also a step detrimental to ongoing efforts to ease tensions". Sinha also stated that after being dismissed as the Chief Minister, he informed Rajiv Gandhi about the "role of some Congress leaders" in the riots.

The Muslims in Bihar had traditionally served as a Congress (I) vote bank, but after the 1989 violence, they shifted their loyalty to Lalu Prasad Yadav, who became the Chief Minister of the state in 1990. However, the subsequent governments were also accused of not meting out the justice. The survivors accused Lalu Prasad Yadav of not punishing the rioters because many of them belonged to his own caste.

On 12 May 2005, a Bhagalpur court sentenced 10 people to life imprisonment on 12 May for the murder of five Muslims in Kamarganj village of the district in the riots.

When Nitish Kumar became the Chief Minister, he ordered 27 cases to be reopened for investigation in 2006. This led to the re-trial of Kameshwar Yadav, who had earlier been acquitted and given a citation by the state police for "maintaining communal harmony". He was convicted for killing of 15-year old Mohammad Qayyum. However, in 2017, he was acquitted by the Patna High Court. It was alleged that he "benefited from his proximity to both RJD and BJP and, most importantly, due to JD(U)’s alliance with these parties and Congress."   After acquittal, he expressed his desire to contest election on a Bhartiya Janata Party ticket.  

In 2007, 14 more people were convicted for their role in the Logain massacre. A number of victims were compensated in 2012 by the State Government.

NN Singh Enquiry Commission Report 

Soon after coming to power in November 2005, Nitish Kumar set up the Bhagalpur Riots Probe Commission under Justice N. N. Singh to probe the riots. The Commission submitted its 1000-page report in February 2015; the report was presented in the Bihar Legislative Assembly on 7 August 2015. It held the inaction by the then Congress government, the local administration and the police responsible for the deadly clashes.

References

1989 in India
Bhagalpur violence, 1989
Bhagalpur violence, 1989
Rajiv Gandhi administration
Bhagalpur district
History of Bihar (1947–present)
Crime in Bihar
Bhagalpus
1989 riots
October 1989 events in Asia
November 1989 events in Asia